Conus planorbis, common name the planorbis cone or the ringed cone, is a species of sea snail, a marine gastropod mollusk in the family Conidae, the cone snails and their allies.

Like all species within the genus Conus, these snails are predatory and venomous. They are capable of "stinging" humans, therefore live ones should be handled carefully or not at all.

Description
The size of the shell varies between 26.1 mm and 82 mm. The whorls of the spire are striate, maculate with chestnut. The body whorl is shows beaded striae below. Sometimes the granular striae cover the entire surface. It is orange-brown or chestnut, frequently light-banded in the middle, and sometimes at the shoulder also. Its base is darker-colored.

Distribution
This marine species occurs in the Red Sea; in the Indian Ocean off Madagascar, the Seychelles and the Mascarene Islands; in the Indo-West Pacific and Oceania; off Australia (Northern Territory, Queensland and Western Australia).

References

 Born, I. von 1778. Index rerum naturalium Musei Caesarei Vindobonensis, pl. 1, Testacea. – Verzeichniss etc. Illust. Vindobonae. Vienna : J.P. Krauss xlii 458 pp. 
 Bruguière, M. 1792. Encyclopédie Méthodique ou par ordre de matières. Histoire naturelle des vers. Paris : Panckoucke Vol. 1 i–xviii, 757 pp.
 Gmelin J.F. 1791. Caroli a Linné. Systema Naturae per regna tria naturae, secundum classes, ordines, genera, species, cum characteribus, differentiis, synonymis, locis. Lipsiae : Georg. Emanuel. Beer Vermes. Vol. 1(Part 6) pp. 3021–3910.
 Schubert, G.H. & Wagner, J.A. 1829. Neues systematisches Conchylien-Cabinet, angefangen von Martini und Chemnitz, fortgesetzt. Nürnberg : Bauer und Raspe Vol. 12 Xii + 196 pp., pls 214–237.
 Iredale, T. 1929. Queensland molluscan notes, No. 1. Memoirs of the Queensland Museum 9(3): 261–297, pls 30–31 
 Fenaux 1942. Nouvelles espèces du genre Conus. Bulletin de l'Institut Océanographique Monaco 814: 1–4 
 Habe, T. 1964. Shells of the Western Pacific in color. Osaka : Hoikusha Vol. 2 233 pp., 66 pls.
 Wilson, B.R. & Gillett, K. 1971. Australian Shells: illustrating and describing 600 species of marine gastropods found in Australian waters. Sydney : Reed Books 168 pp. 
 Cernohorsky, W.O. 1978. Tropical Pacific Marine Shells. Sydney : Pacific Publications 352 pp., 68 pls.
 Wilson, B. 1994. Australian Marine Shells. Prosobranch Gastropods. Kallaroo, WA : Odyssey Publishing Vol. 2 370 pp.
 Röckel, D., Korn, W. & Kohn, A.J. 1995. Manual of the Living Conidae. Volume 1: Indo-Pacific Region. Wiesbaden : Hemmen 517 pp.
  Fenzan W.J. & Filmer R.M. (2013) Types of the cones described by André Fenaux rediscovered at last. The Cone Collector 23: 33–65
 Puillandre N., Duda T.F., Meyer C., Olivera B.M. & Bouchet P. (2015). One, four or 100 genera? A new classification of the cone snails. Journal of Molluscan Studies. 81: 1–23

External links
 The Conus Biodiversity website
 Cone Shells – Knights of the Sea
 

planorbis
Gastropods described in 1778